Miribel is the name or part of the name of several communes in France:

 Miribel, Ain
 Miribel, Drôme
 Miribel-Lanchâtre, Isère département
 Miribel-les-Échelles, Isère département